is a Japanese freelance anime/manga artist from Hokkaidō, Japan. He mainly provides character designs for bishōjo characters.

Works
Character design
Happy Lesson
Futakoi
Memories Off
Memories Off 2nd
Myself ; Yourself
Chaos;Head
Chaos;Head Love Chu Chu!
Majika Majika
L@ve Once
Chaos;Child
Chaos;Child Love Chu Chu!!

Illustration
Aquarian Age
Aquarian Age Alternative
Character Net Ai$Tantei no Jiken Bo
Futakoi Alternative
Misuteri Aru Character Net

Other
Yogurting

References

External links
Mutsumi Sasaki's personal website 

People from Hokkaido
Living people
Japanese illustrators
Year of birth missing (living people)